This is a list of hillside letters (also known as mountain monograms), large geoglyphs found primarily in the Western United States. There are about 600 in total, but the status of many of these symbols are uncertain, due to vagueness in sources.

The states with the most hillside letters are:
 Montana: 86 monograms
 California: 83 monograms
 Utah: 83 monograms
 Arizona: 63 monograms
 Nevada: 47 monograms
 Oregon: 39 monograms
 Idaho: 36 monograms

United States

Arizona

California

Colorado
At least 25 monograms, possibly 28

Idaho

Maryland

Montana

Nevada

New Mexico
At least 30 monograms, possibly 37

Oregon

Texas
Texas' 16 or more monograms are all in the westernmost mountainous, part of the state.  There are six (in various states of repair) in El Paso alone, the most in any single city in the United States.

Utah

Washington
Most of Washington's 18 to 19 monograms are in the arid Eastern part of the state.

Wyoming
Between 24 and 25 monograms

Other states

More countries

Messages are common on the bare mountains surrounding Lima, Peru; most of them are personal graffiti, not community symbols.

See also

 Gozan no Okuribi, Japanese festival involving giant hillside bonfires in the shape of characters

Notes

External links

Mountain Monograms, a website explaining the origins and with an incomplete list and pictures
Hillside Letters, a companion website to a book on the subject
Letters on Hills, a category on waymarking.com for geocachers

Geoglyphs
Hill figures in the United States
Hill figures in Canada
Lists of public art